The 1964 United States Senate election in Nebraska took place on November 3, 1964. The incumbent Republican Senator, Roman Hruska, was re-elected by a wide margin over Raymond W. Arndt, winning every county save for Saline County. His victory vastly overperformed Barry Goldwater, the Republican presidential nominee, who lost the state by 5% in the concurrent presidential election. This was the only race in the 1964 United States Senate elections in which the Republicans won by double digits.

Democratic primary

Candidates
Raymond W. Arndt, founder of Columbus Engineering and Habco Manufacturing

Results

Republican primary

Candidates
Roman Hruska, the incumbent Senator

Results

Results

References 

1964
Nebraska
United States Senate